The Body Shop International Limited, trading as The Body Shop, is a British cosmetics, skin care and perfume company.

Founded in 1976 by Anita Roddick, the company currently has a range of 1,000 products sold in about 3,000 stores, divided between those owned by the company and franchised outlets in more than 65 countries.

Originally trading from Brighton, the company is now based in London Bridge and Littlehampton, West Sussex, and is owned by Brazilian cosmetics company Natura as a subsidiary of the Natura & Co group. The company had been owned by the French cosmetics company L'Oréal between 2006 and 2017. In September 2017, L'Oréal sold the company to Brazilian Natura & Co for £880 million.

History

The original Body Shop, unaffiliated with Anita Roddick or The Body Shop International Limited, was opened in Berkeley, California in 1970 by Peggy Short and Jane Saunders.  The shop featured dark green walls, locally made skin care products, and custom scenting with essential oils. The products were sold in simple containers with handwritten labels, and a discount was given to customers who brought in empty containers for refills.

Anita Roddick opened her own health and beauty shop, also named The Body Shop, in her hometown of Brighton in 1976. She started a business with the motivation to simply "make a living for herself and her two daughters while her husband was away travelling."

The business's original vision was to sell products with ethically-sourced, cruelty-free and natural ingredients. None of Roddick's products were tested on animals, and the ingredients were sourced directly from producers.

The shop began trading with just 25 products. Roddick had purchased urine sample bottles from a nearby hospital to sell her products in, but did not have enough of them, creating the business's refillable bottles policy. Labels were hand-written and Roddick did not advertise explicitly, preferring to rely on local press instead.

In 1977, Roddick purchased another shop through selling 50% of the business to a local garage owner. Roddick's partner, Gordon, returned to Brighton from America in this time, and suggested the business foster growth through franchising. By 1984, the business had 138 stores, 87 of which were not located in the United Kingdom. By 1994, 89% of the business's locations would be franchises.

 The business went public in April 1984, and was floated on London's Unlisted Securities Market, opening at a price of 95p, with the Roddicks keeping 27.6% shares in the company, and Anita continued as managing director so as to retain control of the company's direction. After it obtained a full listing on the London Stock Exchange, share prices in the company increased dramatically, with prices rising 10,944 percent in the first eight years.

In 1987, Roddick offered $3.5 million to the owners of the original Body Shop, Peggy Short and Jane Saunders, for the exclusive rights to the business's name. They agreed to the sale, and in 1992 changed their business's name to "Body Time". The business closed in 2018.

After acquiring the US rights to the name, the UK business began trading in the United States in 1988, with all new stores in the States being company-owned until 1990.

Throughout the 1980s and 90s, the company joined a number of campaigns related to social responsibility and environmental issues. These included a "Trade Not Aid" campaign in 1987, wherein the company sourced some of its ingredients directly from the native communities they originated from. The company also made alliances with Greenpeace and Amnesty International.

1994 Business Ethics expose
The September 1994 Business Ethics magazine published an investigative article entitled "Shattered Image: Is The Body Shop Too Good to Be True?," written by Jon Entine on the company's practices. The article was mentioned on The New York Times''' business section front page and on ABC World News Tonight. This led to a temporary 50% drop in the market value of the stock of the company, which until that point had been considered a model "socially responsible" company.

Entine reported that Anita Roddick, founder of The Body Shop International in the UK, had stolen the name, store design, marketing concept and most product line ideas from The Body Shop founded in 1970 in Berkeley, California by Peggy Short and Jane Saunders who started the French-style perfume store, where customers could do their own blending. Roddick subsequently fabricated her story of travelling the world discovering exotic beauty ingredients. In 1989, Roddick purchased the US and Israeli rights to The Body Shop name, and the Berkeley-based chain of five stores renamed itself Body Time.

Roddick's unsubstantiated claims and inaccurate reports in popular articles and even some university case studies that Roddick's The Body Shop "gave most of its profits to charity", documents from Britain's Charity Commission showed that Roddick's company gave nothing to charity over its first 11 years and was penurious in its philanthropy thereafter. The Body Shop also faced millions of dollars in claims by disenchanted franchisees.

Entine referred to The Body Shop's marketing as "greenwashing." The article in Business Ethics, which was cited with a National Press Club Award for Consumer Journalism in 1994, is still widely used in university business ethics classes and is generally credited with prompting companies claiming to be socially responsible to match their claims with operational practices and to increase transparency.

The "Shattered Image" article had originally been scheduled to be published as a 10,000-word feature in Vanity Fair earlier in 1994 but was dropped after legal threats by The Body Shop. The original article was eventually published in 2004 by The Nation Books in Killed: Great Journalism Too Hot to Print, edited by David Wallis. Business Ethics, which had featured Roddick on its cover the year before, subsequently agreed to print a much shorter version of the exposé.

L'Oréal

In March 2006, The Body Shop agreed to a £652.3 million takeover by L'Oréal. The Roddicks made £130 million from the sale.

The sale caused some media controversy, particularly surrounding L'Oréal's use of animal testing. Although L'Oréal ceased animal testing itself in 1989, the company had begun selling its products in China in 1997, where the law required cosmetics to be tested on animals before sale to the public. Roddick stated that she believed the sale could allow her to be a "Trojan Horse" within the larger company, working through the Body Shop to improve its standards on animal testing and environmental issues.

In September 2007, Roddick died following a major brain hemorrhage.

In 2017, L’Oréal sold The Body Shop to Brazilian cosmetics company Natura in a deal of €1 billion.

In 2019 The Body Shop received its B-Corp certification.

 The Body Shop At Home: direct sales, multilevel marketing channel 
In addition to retail channels, products from The Body Shop are available through "The Body Shop At Home" multilevel marketing network. The network was established in 1994. Distributors (or consultants) can also recruit others to sell the products. The Body Shop At Home currently operates in the UK, Australia, and the USA.

The multilevel marketing program was known as "The Body Shop Direct" in Britain, and was first trialled in Australia in Gippsland in 1997. In 1998, the Australian division was featured in the Australian Financial Review for their motivational-based policy of funding unrelated courses for home distributors, such as tarot reading or French polishing. In 2003, Anita Roddick parted with her publisher HarperCollins, but despite this, planned to release two titles. That same year, Roddick predicted that the company's home sales would fuel growth, and eventually exceed the sales of retail outlets.

In 2014, an unfair dismissal case ruled against The Body Shop (Adidem Pty Ltd T/A The Body Shop v Suckling [2014] FWCFB 3611). Nicole Suckling worked in an administrative support role for The Body Shop At Home and began a role as an independent direct candle seller for company PartyLite. The Body Shop alleged that Suckling's access to their confidential contractual information could threaten The Body Shop's commercial interests.

Social activism
The Body Shop has long-held aims of social activism as part of its business practices, first evidenced in 1986 when proposing an alliance with Greenpeace to save the whales. Roddick later began launching other promotions through the business tied to social causes, such as featuring posters in its stores and sponsoring local charity and community events.

Over time, Roddick herself took on gradually more critical views of both wider business and the cosmetics industry in particular, criticising what she considered the environmental insensitivity of the industry and its traditional views of beauty, and aimed to change standard corporate practices through her business. Roddick stated that "For me, campaigning and good business is also about putting forward solutions, not just opposing destructive practices or human rights abuses".

In 1997, Roddick launched a global campaign to raise self-esteem in women and against the media stereotyping of women. It focused on unreasonably thin models in the context of rising numbers in bulimia and anorexia.

Community Trade (formerly Trade not Aid)
Launched in 1987, The Body Shop’s Community Trade programme based on the practice of trading with communities in need and giving them a fair price for natural ingredients or handcrafts, including brazil nut oil, sesame seed oil, honey, and shea butter. The first Community Trade product was a wooden footsie roller which was supplied by a small community in Southern India, Teddy Exports, which is still a key Community Trade supplier.

Fair trade activists has criticised the programme. "The company's prominently displayed claims claim to pay fairer prices to the Third World poor but covered less than a fraction of 1 percent of its turnover", wrote Paul Vallely, the former chair of Traidcraft, in the obituary of Anita Roddick published in The Independent''.

The Body Shop regularly invites employees and stakeholders to visit Community Trade suppliers to see the benefits that the Community Trade programme has brought to communities and The Body Shop products.

As part of the Community Trade programme, The Body Shop undertakes periodic social audits of its sourcing activities through Ecocert.

A campaign by Christian Peacemaker Team and other allies protested the alleged role of The Body Shop in purchasing palm oil from Daabon, a third-party supplier in Colombia, who forcefully evicted 123 families from their land at Las Pavas, Columbia on 14 July 2009. The Body Shop initially denied intentionally purchasing palm oil from the Las Pavas area, but later dropped Daabon as a supplier after the company failed to provide proof that it was not involved in the land seizures.

Policy on animal testing

The Body Shop has campaigned to end animal testing in cosmetics alongside animal cruelty NGO Cruelty-Free International since 1989. The company's products are non-animal tested and are certified cruelty-free by Cruelty Free International’s Leaping Bunny.

In June 2017, The Body Shop and Cruelty-Free International launched Forever Against Animal Testing, its largest ever campaign, aimed at banning animal testing in cosmetics everywhere and forever. By the end of 2018, the petition had reached 8.3 million signatures and was taken to the United Nations.

In October 2009, The Body Shop was awarded a Lifetime Achievement Award by the RSPCA in Britain, in recognition of its uncompromised policy which ensures ingredients are not tested by its suppliers.

In 2021, The Body Shop announced that all their products would be certified vegan by The Vegan Society as of the end of 2023. Currently, around 60% of the retailer's products are vegan.

The Body Shop Foundation
The Roddicks founded The Body Shop Foundation in 1990, which supports innovative global projects working in the areas of human and civil rights and environmental and animal protection. It is The Body Shop International's charitable trust funded by annual donations from the company and through various fundraising initiatives. The Body Shop Foundation was formed to consolidate all the charitable donations made by the company. To date, The Body Shop Foundation has donated over £24 million sterling in grants. The Foundation regularly gives gift-in-kind support to various projects and organisations such as Children On The Edge (COTE). Approximately 65% of the grants that the company funds come to nominations from the staff, consultants or franchisers attached to the company from all over the world.

In 2017, The Body Shop announced its new approach to corporate philanthropy, the World Bio-Bridges Mission (Re-Wilding the World). The purpose of the World Bio-Bridges Mission is to enrich biodiversity around the world while creating truly sustainable supply chains where possible.

Products

The Body Shop carries a wide range of products for the body, face, hair and home. The Body Shop claims its products are "inspired by nature" and feature ingredients such as marula oil and sesame seed oil sourced through the Community Trade program.

Products include:
 Body butters (including Moringa, Satsuma, Strawberry, Olive, Shea, Mango and Coconut)
 Body products such as body scrub, body butter and bath lilies
 Cosmetics (including mascara, lipstick, lip gloss, eye shadow and cotton rounds)
 Full skin care ranges (including Tea tree, Vitamin C, Vitamin E, Aloe vera and Seaweed)
 Men's skin care (Including maca root and white musk)
 Hair care (including their famous Banana shampoo and Banana conditioner)
 Fragrances (Women's and Men's)
 Bath products including shower gels and solid soaps
 High-end skincare range such as Oils of Life 
 Face masks including sheet masks

References

External links

 

Littlehampton
Companies formerly listed on the London Stock Exchange
Fair trade brands
Retail companies of the United Kingdom
Companies based in West Sussex
Cosmetics companies of the United Kingdom
Retail companies established in 1976
British companies established in 1976
2006 mergers and acquisitions
2017 mergers and acquisitions
British subsidiaries of foreign companies
B Lab-certified corporations